Ekkachai Rittipan (born May 23, 1990), simply known as Puen, is a Thai professional footballer who plays as a winger for Thai League 2 club Ayutthaya United.

References

External links
 Profile at Goal

1990 births
Living people
Ekkachai Rittipan
Ekkachai Rittipan
Association football wingers
Ekkachai Rittipan
Ekkachai Rittipan
Ekkachai Rittipan
Ekkachai Rittipan
Ekkachai Rittipan
Ekkachai Rittipan